Elephant Song is a 1991 novel by Wilbur Smith. Publishers Weekly stated that the novel contained "some romance, more sex, lots of bloody fighting and international intrigues, all carried out by deftly directed larger-than-life cardboard characters, will surely please Smith's fans and other action-addicted readers."

It was the third-highest selling novel in England in 1992.

Plot
Documentary filmmaker Daniel Armstrong vows revenge after a gang of poachers steals a huge cache of ivory and kills Chief Warden Johnny Nzou, Armstrong's childhood friend.

References

Novels by Wilbur Smith
1991 British novels
Books about elephants
Novels set in Africa
Macmillan Publishers books